Vemdalen is a village situated in Härjedalen Municipality, Jämtland County, Sweden with 542 inhabitants in 2010.

Vemdalen has been developed as a skiing center. There are three popular ski resorts close to the Vemdalen; Vemdalsskalet, Klövsjö/Storhogna and Björnrike.

Vemdalen Church  (Vemdalens kyrka) was erected in 1624 and moved to its present site in 1763. The church building was constructed of wood and  covered with wood shingles. A free standing bell tower was erected in 1755. The foundation consists of  natural stone.
The church  has an octagonal floor plan.
The church pulpit is carved by  Jöns Ljungberg (1736-1818). The altarpiece was carved by Jonas Granberg (1696-1776) between 1770 and 1773.
The church  belongs to the parish of Hedebygden in the Diocese of Härnösand.

References

External links
Vemdalsskalet website
Vemdalen website

Populated places in Härjedalen Municipality
Härjedalen